Azad Azerbaijan TV (ATV) is a private television station in Azerbaijan.  It has been broadcasting since December 25, 2000. ATV began broadcasting through movies and music videos, but later news, shows and other programs were added. In the last years, ATV claimed to be the most popular and the most viewable channel in Azerbaijan.

References

External links
Official website 

Television stations in Azerbaijan
Television networks in Azerbaijan
Azerbaijani-language television stations
Television channels and stations established in 2000
2000 establishments in Azerbaijan